Philippe Agostini was a French cinematographer, director and screenwriter born 11 August 1910 in Paris (France), died 20 October 2001. He was married to Odette Joyeux until the end of her life.

Biography 

Founder of École Louis-Lumière (situated on rue de Vaugirard), Philippe Agostini debuted as assistant to the chief operators Georges Périnal and Armand Thirard. In the 1930s, he began a fruitful career as director of photography, working with directors with such differing styles as Robert Bresson, Marcel Carné, Max Ophüls, Claude Autant-Lara, Jean Grémillon, Yves Allégret, Jules Dassin and even Julien Duvivier. His career as a director was much less remarkable.

Filmography

As cinematographer 
 1934 : Itto
 1936 : Forty Little Mothers
 1936 : Hélène
 1936 : Aventure à Paris
 1936 : À nous deux, madame la vie
 1936 : Baccara
 1937 : Hercule
 1937 : Life Dances On
 1938 : I Was an Adventuress
 1938 : Rasputin (La Tragédie impériale)
 1938 : Storm Over Asia 
 1938 : Le Ruisseau
 1939 :The Fatted Calf 
 1939 : Le Jour se lève
 1940 : Thunder Over Paris
 1942 : Le Mariage de Chiffon
 1942 : Lettres d'amour
 1943 : Les Deux timides
 1943 : Les Ailes blanches
 1943 : Monsieur des Lourdines
 1943 : Les Anges du péché
 1943 : Douce
 1944 : First on the Rope 
 1945 : Enquête du 58
 1945 : Les dames du Bois de Boulogne
 1946 :Sylvie and the Ghost
 1946 : Lessons in Conduct 
 1946 : Les Portes de la nuit
 1948 : The Last Vacation
 1949 : White Paws
 1949 : Monseigneur
 1950 : lt=Julie de Carneilhan
 1950 : L'Inconnue de Montréal
 1951 : Topaze
 1951 : Gibier de potence
 1951 : La Peau d'un homme
 1951 : The Night Is My Kingdom
 1952 : Le Plaisir
 1953 : Une fille dans le soleil
 1953 : Their Last Night 
 1953 : The Lady of the Camellias
 1953 : The Beauty of Cadiz
 1954 : Châteaux en Espagne (El Torero)
 1955 : Il Padrone sono me...
 1955 : Du rififi chez les hommes
 1956 : Si Paris nous était conté
 1956 : Le Monde du silence
 1956 : Le Pays d'où je viens
 1956 : Paris, Palace Hotel 
 1957 : Les Trois font la paire
 1957 : Le Corbusier, l'architecte du bonheur
 1964 : Le Vrai visage de Thérèse de Lisieux

As director 
 1958 : Le Naïf aux quarante enfants
 1960 : Tu es Pierre
 1960 : Dialogue with the Carmelites
 1962 : Rencontres
 1963 : La Soupe aux poulets
 1964 : Le Vrai visage de Thérèse de Lisieux
 1966 : L'Âge heureux (TV)
 1967 : La Bonne peinture (TV)
 1969 : Le Trésor des Hollandais (TV)
 1971 : La Petite fille à la recherche du printemps
 1975 : L'Âge en fleur (TV)

As screenwriter 
 1956 : The Bride Is Much Too Beautiful
 1958 : Le Naïf aux quarante enfants
 1960 : Le Dialogue des Carmélites
 1962 : Rencontres
 1964 : Le Vrai visage de Thérèse de Lisieux
 1967 : La Bonne peinture (TV)
 1975 : L'Âge en fleur (série TV)
 1984 : Le Dialogue des Carmélites (TV)

Sources

External links 
 

1910 births
2001 deaths
Writers from Paris
French cinematographers
French film directors
French male screenwriters
20th-century French screenwriters
20th-century French male writers